La Perle may refer to:

La Perle (ballet), by Petipa
La Perle, Edmonton, Alberta, Canada
Laurette la Perle (born 1989), Congolese singer